The Amazonian Guard (also the "Amazons") was an unofficial name given by Western journalists to an all-female elite cadre of bodyguards officially known as The Revolutionary Nuns (ar-rāhibāt ath-thawriyyāt), tasked with protecting the late, former leader of Libya, Muammar Gaddafi.

Formation
The group was formed in the early 1980s, after Gaddafi's official resignation as Libyan head of state in favour of the title of "Brotherly Leader and Guide of the First of September Great Revolution of the Great Socialist People's Libyan Arab Jamahiriya".

According to Joseph T. Stanik, Gaddafi reportedly employed a cadre of female bodyguards because he believed that an Arab gunman would have difficulty firing at women. However, it has also been submitted by other authors that Gaddafi's female bodyguards were, in reality, just an aspect of the dictator's well-known eccentric showmanship and his fondness of surrounding himself with young women. Gaddafi would usually travel with 15 of his Amazonian Guards assigned to security or housekeeping.

Training
Candidates for the Amazonian Guard participated in firearms and martial arts training at a special academy, were required to take an oath of chastity, then were chosen by Gaddafi.

Incidents
In 1998, one of Gaddafi's female bodyguards was killed and seven others were wounded when Islamic fundamentalists in Libya ambushed Gaddafi's motorcade. It was claimed that the dead guard, Aisha, was Gaddafi's favourite and threw herself across Gaddafi's body to stop the bullets.

In November 2006, as Gaddafi arrived at Nnamdi Azikiwe International Airport in Abuja, Nigeria, with a 200-strong troop of heavily armed bodyguards, a diplomatic incident was caused as security officials tried to disarm them. Gaddafi furiously walked away, gesturing that he intended to cover the  journey to the capital on foot, and could be persuaded to yield only after intervention by Nigerian president Olusegun Obasanjo, who coincidentally was also at the airport.

Abuse claims
In the latter days of the Libyan Civil War, accusations emerged from five members of the Amazonian Guard of rape and other abuse by the upper echelons of the Gaddafi government, which included Gaddafi, his sons, and senior officials. Some Amazonian Guards claim they were offered a choice between suicide and executing rebels (Al-Qaeda).

See also

Dahomey Amazons
The Dictator, a Sacha Baron Cohen film parodying the Guard

References

First Libyan Civil War
20th-century women
21st-century women
All-female military units and formations
Bodyguards
Libyan women
Military of Libya
Muammar Gaddafi
Protective security units
Women in warfare post-1945
Violence against women in Libya